Platyptilia comstocki is a moth of the family Pterophoridae. It is found in North America from Yukon to New Brunswick and south to Arizona and California. The habitat consists of boreal forest.

References

Moths described in 1939
comstocki